Dave Petzke (born c. 1957) was an American football player.  He played college football for the Northern Illinois Huskies football team from 1977 to 1978. In 11 games during the 1978 season, he caught 91 passes for 1,215 yards and 11 touchdowns. He led the NCAA Division I-A colleges that year in receiving yards and receiving touchdowns. He was selected as the Mid-American Conference Offensive Player of the Year in 1978. He later worked for the Capital Financial Group in Boulder, Colorado.

See also
 List of NCAA major college football yearly receiving leaders

References

American football wide receivers
Northern Illinois Huskies football players
Living people
1957 births
People from Faribault, Minnesota
Players of American football from Minnesota